Too Much Sleep is the second album by the experimental college rock/art rock band Bongwater. It was released in 1989. In 1998, the album was remastered by Alan Douches and Kramer for its inclusion in Box of Bongwater set.

Most of the songs are written by Mark Kramer and Ann Magnuson with some exceptions. "Talent Is a Vampire," "The Bad Review," and "Ill Fated Lovers Go Time Tripping" were written by Kramer, Magnuson, and Dave Rick. The title track was written strictly by Kramer, while "One So Black" was written by former King Missile member Dogbowl. Notable cover tunes include "The Drum" written by Peter Blegvad and Anthony Moore, "Why Are We Sleeping?" by Kevin Ayers, and "Splash 1" by the 13th Floor Elevators, one of two Roky Erickson covers with which Bongwater made themselves famous.

Music videos were created for the songs "The Drum", "Why Are We Sleeping" and "Psychedelic Sewing Room",  all directed by Brad Dunning.

Track listing

Personnel 
Adapted from the Too Much Sleep liner notes.

Bongwater
Kramer – vocals, instruments, engineering, production
David Licht – drums, percussion
Ann Magnuson – vocals
Dave Rick – guitar

Production and additional personnel
Coby Batty – French horn
Michael Macioce – photography
Jim Shaw – art direction

Release history

Legacy 
Electric Six covered "The Living End". Their version was released as B-side on the single Gay Bar.

References

External links 
 

1989 albums
Albums produced by Kramer (musician)
Bongwater (band) albums
Shimmy Disc albums